Menecratistis is a genus of moth in the family Gelechiidae. It contains the species Menecratistis sciaula, which is found in New Guinea.

References

Gelechiinae